Alan Jackson is an American country music artist. The first artist signed to Arista Nashville Records, he was with them from 1989 to 2011. He has released 15 studio albums, two Christmas albums, 10 compilations, and a tribute album for the label, as well as 67 singles.

Out of his singles, all but seven have reached Top 40 or higher on the Billboard country singles charts, including 26 number one hits. Of these, two have been listed by Billboard as the number one song of the year on the Billboard Year-End charts: "Don't Rock the Jukebox" in 1991 and "Chattahoochee" in 1993. His longest-lasting number one country hit and biggest pop hit is "It's Five O'Clock Somewhere", a duet with Jimmy Buffett, which spent eight non-consecutive weeks at number one in 2003 and peaked at number 17 on the Billboard Hot 100.

Singles

1980s–1990s

2000s

2010s–2020s

Other singles

Featured singles

Christmas singles

Other charted songs

Videography

Music videos

Guest appearances

Notes

References

Jackson, Alan
Alan Jackson songs
Jackson, Alan